Morten Frisch is a Danish epidemiologist who works as a consultant and senior investigator at the Statens Serum Institut in Copenhagen.

Education and career
Frisch received his M.D. in 1989, his Ph.D. in 1995, and his D.Sc. in 2002, all from the University of Copenhagen. In 2008, he was appointed an associate professor at the University of Copenhagen. In 2012, he was appointed an adjunct professor of sexual health epidemiology at Aalborg University.

Research
Frisch's research focuses on the epidemiology of sexual health, cancers and autoimmune diseases.

Selected works
 Frisch, Morten, Robert J. Biggar, James J. Goedert, and AIDS–Cancer Match Registry Study Group. "Human papillomavirus-associated cancers in patients with human immunodeficiency virus infection and acquired immunodeficiency syndrome." Journal of the National Cancer Institute 92, no. 18 (2000): 1500-1510.
 Frisch, Morten, Robert J. Biggar, Eric A. Engels, James J. Goedert, and AIDS-Cancer Match Registry Study Group. "Association of cancer with AIDS-related immunosuppression in adults." Jama 285, no. 13 (2001): 1736-1745.
 Frisch, Morten, Bengt Glimelius, Adriaan JC van den Brule, Jan Wohlfahrt, Chris JLM Meijer, Jan MM Walboomers, Sven Goldman, Christer Svensson, Hans-Olov Adami, and Mads Melbye. "Sexually transmitted infection as a cause of anal cancer." New England Journal of Medicine 337, no. 19 (1997): 1350-1358.
 Engels, Eric A., Morten Frisch, James J. Goedert, Robert J. Biggar, and Robert W. Miller. "Merkel cell carcinoma and HIV infection." The Lancet 359, no. 9305 (2002): 497-498.

References

Danish public health doctors
University of Copenhagen alumni
Academic staff of Aalborg University
Living people
Genital integrity activists
Year of birth missing (living people)